"Camera Phone" is the fourth single from The Game's third album, LAX. The song features R&B singer Ne-Yo. The song was produced by Cool & Dre. It appears as a bonus track on the deluxe edition of the album only. The single was only released for download in the UK and not the USA. In the UK, "Camera Phone" was the second single taken from  LAX. It did not originally feature on the UK edition of the album and was thus re-issued, removing the "Intro" and "Outro" and adding "Camera Phone" as the final track.

Music video
The music video for the song was shot at the Copacabana nightclub in Los Angeles, California on November 4, 2008 and was directed by Kevin Connolly, who was only hired for the video six days before. The setting takes place in a bar, with The Game and Ne-Yo wearing suits and hats in the main performance scene. The video premiered on FNMTV on Friday, December 5, 2008 at 8pm. The video features cameo appearances by Clyde Carson, The Menace, Pleasure P and Cheryl Burke.

The video rose in its first week to the number one spot on the Billboard Hot Videoclip Tracks.

Charts 
The song debuted at #48 in the United Kingdom after the physical release.
Despite not reaching the Top 20, it received much airplay on UK television.

References

External links

2008 singles
The Game (rapper) songs
Ne-Yo songs
Songs written by Ne-Yo
Song recordings produced by Cool & Dre
Songs written by The Game (rapper)
2008 songs
Geffen Records singles